212th may refer to:

212th Division (disambiguation), various military units
212th Brigade (United Kingdom)
212th Battalion (American Legion), CEF, a unit in the Canadian Expeditionary Force during the First World War
212th Coast Artillery (United States), a Coast artillery Regiment in the New York National Guard
212th Fires Brigade (United States), an artillery brigade in the United States Army
212th Infantry Division (Wehrmacht), raised in August 1939 and remained on garrison duty in Germany until March 1941
212th Rescue Squadron, a unit of the Alaska Air National Guard
212th Airborne Brigade of the Soviet Union.

See also
212 (number)
212, the year 212 (CCXII) of the Julian calendar